Meinrad is a German male given name, which means "strong advisor", from the German words  magan "mighty, strong" and rad "counsel". The name may refer to:

Meinrad of Einsiedeln (797–861), German saint
Meinrad I, Prince of Hohenzollern-Sigmaringen (1605–1681), German prince
Meinrad II, Prince of Hohenzollern-Sigmaringen (1673–1715), German prince
Meinrad Lienert (1865–1933), Swiss writer
Meinrad Miltenberger (1924–1993), German sprint canoer 
Meinrad Schütter (1910–2006), Swiss composer
Meinrad von Lauchert (1905–1987), German general

References

Given names
German masculine given names